LGDT may refer to:
 Grand dictionnaire terminologique
 Leachianone-G 2''-dimethylallyltransferase, an enzyme